Víctor Cortés is a Colombian footballer who plays as a striker or right winger.

References

External links
 

1976 births
Living people
Association football forwards
Colombian footballers
Envigado F.C. players
Deportivo Pereira footballers
Independiente Santa Fe footballers
América de Cali footballers
Cúcuta Deportivo footballers
Atlético Junior footballers
Águilas Doradas Rionegro players
Uniautónoma F.C. footballers
Categoría Primera A players
Footballers from Cali